The Election Commission of India (ECI) is a constitutional body. It was established by the Constitution of India to conduct and regulate elections in the country. Article 324 of the Constitution provides that the power of superintendence, direction, and control of elections to parliament, state legislatures, the office of the president of India, and the office of vice-president of India shall be vested in the election commission. Thus, the Election Commission is an all-India body in the sense that it is common to both the Central government and the state governments.

The body administers elections to the Lok Sabha, Rajya Sabha, State Legislative Assemblies, State Legislative Councils and the offices of the President and Vice President of the country. The Election Commission operates under the authority of Constitution per Article 324, and subsequently enacted Representation of the People Act. The commission has the powers under the Constitution, to act in an appropriate manner when the enacted laws make insufficient provisions to deal with a given situation in the conduct of an election. It is a permanent constitutional body.

Structure

The commission was established in 1950 and originally only had one Chief Election Commissioner. Two additional Commissioners were appointed to the commission for the first time on 16 October 1989 (on the eve of the 1989 General Election), but they had a very short tenure, ending on 1 January 1990. "The Election Commissioner Amendment Act, 1989" was adopted on 1 January 1990 which turned the commission into a multi-member body: a 3-member Commission has been in operation since then and the decisions by the commission are made by a majority vote.

The commission is served by its secretariat located in New Delhi. The Election Commissioners are assisted by Deputy Election Commissioners, who are generally IAS officers. They are further assisted by Directors General, Principal Secretaries, and Secretaries and Under Secretaries.

At the state level, Election Commission is assisted by the Chief Electoral Officer of the State, who is an IAS officer of Principal Secretary rank. At the district and constituency levels, the District Magistrates (in their capacity as District Election Officers), Electoral Registration Officers and Returning Officers perform election work.

Tenure
The tenure of election commissioners is not prescribed by Indian Constitution. However, according to THE ELECTION COMMISSION (CONDITIONS OF SERVICE OF ELECTION COMMISSIONERS AND TRANSACTION OF BUSINESS) ACT, 1991 Chief Election Commissioner or an Election Commissioner shall hold office
for a term of six years, or up to the age of 65 years, whichever is earlier, from the date on which he/she assumes his/her office.

Removal from office 
The Chief Election Commissioner of India can be represented removed from their office in a manner similar to the removal of a judge of the Supreme Court of India which requires a resolution passed by the Parliament of India a two-thirds majority in both the Lok Sabha and the Rajya Sabha on the grounds of proved misbehaviour or incapacity.

Other Election Commissioners can be removed by the President of India on the recommendation of the Chief Election Commissioner. A Chief Election Commissioner has never been impeached in India.

In 2009, just before the 2009 Lok Sabha Elections, Chief Election Commissioner N. Gopalaswami sent a recommendation to President Prathibha Patil to remove Election Commissioner Navin Chawla, who was soon to take office as the chief election commissioner and to subsequently supervise the Lok Sabha general election, a potential conflict of interest considering his partisan political party behavior. The President opined that such a recommendation is not binding on the president, and hence rejected it. Subsequently, after Gopalswami's retirement the next month, Chawla became the chief election commissioner and supervised the 2009 Lok Sabha general elections.

Functions

One of the most important features of the democratic policy in India is elections at regular intervals. Holding periodic, free and fair elections are essentials of a democratic system and a part of the basic structure of the Constitution. The Election Commission is regarded as the guardian of elections in the country. In every election, it issues a Model Code of Conduct for political parties and candidates to conduct elections in a free and fair manner. The commission issued the Code of Conduct for the first time in 1971 for the 5th Lok Sabha elections and has revised it from time to time. It lays down guidelines for the conduct of political parties and candidates during an election period. However, there have been instances of violation of the code by various political parties with complaints being received for misuse of official machinery by the candidates. The code does not have any specific statutory basis but only a persuasive effect. It contains the rules of electoral morality. However, this lack of statutory backing does not prevent the commission from enforcing it.

A law for the registration process for political parties was enacted in 1989 and a number of parties got registered with the commission. The registration helps avoid confusion and ensures that the political parties are brought under the purview of the commission.

The election commission has the right to allow symbols to the political parties. It gives recognition to the national parties, state parties and regional parties. It sets limits on poll expenses. The commission prepare electoral rolls and update the voter's list from time to time. Notifications of dates and schedules of election for filing nominations are issued by the commission. It is noteworthy that Election commission cannot allot same symbol to two regional political parties even if they are not in the same state.

The commission is empowered with prohibiting dissemination or publication of voting trends that seek to influence voters by opinion polls or exit polls.

To curb the growing influence of money during elections, the Election Commission has made many suggestions and changes in this regard. The commission has appointed IRS officers of the Income Tax Department as Election Observers (Expenditure) of all elections and has fixed the legal limits on the amount of money which a candidate can spend during election campaigns. These limits have been revised over time. The Election Commission, by appointing expenditure observers from the Indian Revenue Service, keeps an eye on the individual account of election expenditure. The commission takes details of the candidate's assets on affidavit at the time of submitting nomination paper, who are also required to give details of their expenditure within 30 days of the declaration of results. The campaign period has also been reduced by the commission from 21 to 14 days for Lok Sabha and Assembly elections to cut down election expenditure.

In an attempt to decriminalise politics, the Election Commission has approached the Supreme Court to put a lifetime ban on convicted politicians from contesting elections.

Voter Id
In an effort to prevent electoral fraud, in 1993, EPICs or Electors Photo Identity Cards were issued, which became mandatory by the 2004 elections. However ration cards have been allowed for election purposes in certain situations.

RONET
Software mobile application, developed for Election Commission of India, by 01 Synergy, which makes the voting process less cumbersome and ensure that the general public is aware of the candidates in an election. The RONet suite of web and mobile applications is for all stakeholders involved in the election process. This would help them monitor the assigned tasks at all levels for the smooth conduct of elections.

ECI360
ECI 360 mobile application was developed for the general public — which comprises signed and sworn affidavits of the contesting candidates, a list of rejected candidates, the final list of candidates, pickup requests for voters with disability, queue status (people waiting in line to cast votes), real-time poll booth-wise polling percentage, grievance redressal, and the results. The candidate app of ECI360 allows them to request permissions for rallies and is also mapped with redressal systems, which ensures that all the issues are sorted at the earliest.”

Voting Procedure

Voting in India is done using Electronic voting machines or EVMs, there is also a provision for the Postal voting in India, as well as the special arrangements for the disabled voters.

Electronic voting machines (EVM)
India has been the first country to adopt Electronic Voting at such a large scale. Electronic voting machines (EVM) were introduced by Election Commission in order to reduce malpractices and improve efficiency. They were tried for the first time on an experimental basis for the 1982 Kerala State Legislative Assembly Elections. After a successful testing and the legal inquiries, the commission took the decision to begin the use of these voting machines.

The introduction of Voter-verified paper audit trail (VVPAT) in eight Lok Sabha constituencies in 2014 Indian General Elections was a big achievement for the Election Commission. This Voter-verified paper audit trail (VVPAT) system was first used with EVMs in a by-poll in September 2013 in Noksen (Assembly Constituency) in Nagaland. and eventually in all elections from September 2013 onwards in various Legislative elections in the country.

Photo electoral rolls with photographs of the candidates on the EVMs were first introduced in the 2015 Bihar Legislative Assembly election.

In 2014, none of the above or NOTA was also added as an option on the voting machines which is now a mandatory option to be provided in any election. The specific symbol for NOTA, a ballot paper with a black cross across it, was introduced on 18 September 2015. The symbol has been designed by National Institute of Design, Ahmedabad.

Election Commission organised an open hackathon on 3 June 2017, to attempt hacking of Electronic Voting Machine used by the commission in various Indian elections. The NCP and CPI(M) were the only two parties that registered for the event but none of them participated.
The EVM hacking claims remained as allegations only and were usually used by the parties which lost elections. Functioning of EVMs and VVPAT machines were demonstrated to the teams.

Postal voting 
Postal voting in India is done only through the "Electronically Transmitted Postal Ballot Papers (ETPB)" system of Election Commission of India, ballot papers are distributed to the registered eligible voters who return the votes by post. Postal votes are counted first before the counting of votes from the EVM. Only certain categories of people are eligible to register as postal voters. Employees working in the union armed forces and state police as well as their spouses, and those working for the Government of India who are officially posted abroad can register for the postal vote, these are also called the "Service voters". People in preventive detention can use postal vote. Prisoners can not vote at all.

Electors with disabilities 
The Election Commission of India came under severe criticism when an RTI application filed by activist Dr Satendra Singh revealed the commission's ill-preparedness to safeguard electors with disabilities in the 2014 Lok Sabha elections. There were many violations of the Supreme Court order from 2014 to enfranchise persons with disabilities. In Karnataka, Election commission has offered sign language support to assist voters with speech and hearing impairment.

See also 
History of democracy in the Indian-subcontinent
States Election Commission (India)

References

External links 
Election Commission of India Official Portal
ECI : Voter Information
National Voters Service Portal This service is provided by the ECI. Users can search their name by providing their details such as State Name, First Name, Last Name, Assembly Constituency Name, Gender, etc. to perform the search. District-wise search option is also available.
Election Commission of India profile by Elections Canada.

Links to Chief Electoral Officers of states and union territories 
29 States of India

Chief Electoral Officer, Andhra Pradesh Official Portal
Chief Electoral Officer, Arunachal Pradesh Official Portal
Chief Electoral Officer, Assam Official Portal
Chief Electoral Officer, Bihar Official Portal
Chief Electoral Officer, Chhattisgarh Official Portal
Chief Electoral Officer, Goa Official Portal
Chief Electoral Officer, Gujarat Official Portal
Chief Electoral Officer, Haryana Official Portal
Chief Electoral Officer, Himachal Pradesh Official Portal
Chief Electoral Officer, Jammu and Kashmir Official Portal
Chief Electoral Officer, Jharkhand Official Portal
Chief Electoral Officer, Karnataka Official Portal
Chief Electoral Officer, Kerala Official Portal
Chief Electoral Officer, Madhya Pradesh Official Portal
Chief Electoral Officer, Maharashtra Official Portal
Chief Electoral Officer, Manipur Official Portal
Chief Electoral Officer, Meghalaya Official Portal
Chief Electoral Officer, Mizoram Official Portal
Chief Electoral Officer, Nagaland Official Portal
Chief Electoral Officer, Odisha Official Portal
Chief Electoral Officer, Punjab Official Portal
Chief Electoral Officer, Rajasthan Official Portal
Chief Electoral Officer, Sikkim Official Portal
Chief Electoral Officer, Tamil Nadu Official Portal
Chief Electoral Officer, Telangana Official Portal
Chief Electoral Officer, Tripura Official Portal
Chief Electoral Officer, Uttar Pradesh Official Portal
Chief Electoral Officer, Uttarakhand Official Portal
Chief Electoral Officer, West Bengal Official Portal

7 union territories of India

Chief Electoral Officer, Andaman and Nicobar Islands Official Portal
Chief Electoral Officer, Chandigarh Official Portal
Chief Electoral Officer, Dadra and Nagar Haveli Official Portal
Chief Electoral Officer, Daman and Diu Official Portal
Chief Electoral Officer, Delhi Official Portal
Chief Electoral Officer, Lakshadweep Official Portal
Chief Electoral Officer, Puducherry Official Portal

 
Indian commissions and inquiries
1950 establishments in India
Government agencies established in 1950
India